The Broome Dusters were an ice hockey team in the North American Hockey League. They played in Binghamton, New York, United States at the Broome County Veterans Memorial Arena. The team logo was designed by Johnny Hart, artist of the comic strip B.C. and a Binghamton native.

History

The Dusters played in the NAHL, which served as the inspiration for the movie Slap Shot, which includes a "Broome County" team. One scene in the film was specifically drawn from events that occurred in Binghamton. In the movie, the Hanson brothers wear black-rimmed, Coke-bottle eyeglasses, and in one game, get into a fight immediately after the opening faceoff.  In reality, both Jeff and Steve Carlson of the Johnstown Jets wore similar glasses, and did get into a long fight right after an opening faceoff. Johnstown Coach Dick Roberge told the Johnstown Tribune-Democrat, "We got into Binghamton about two or three weeks before the playoffs. In the team warmup, we're out there and all the Binghamton players came out with the plastic glasses and big noses, every one of them, poking fun at the Carlson brothers. We went back in the dressing room and the boys said, 'Coach, as soon as that puck is dropped, we're pairing up.' We had one heckuva fight. They went about 30 minutes until everyone got tired. We met them again in the finals (1974–75) and beat them four straight."

When the NAHL folded in 1977, the team was replaced by the Binghamton Dusters of the American Hockey League who previously operated as the Providence Reds.

Season-by-season results
Regular Season

Playoffs

Team records
Goals: 87 Dave Staffen  (1976–77)
Assists: 124 Rod Bloomfield  (1976–77)
Points: 173 Rod Bloomfield  (1976–77)
Penalty Minutes: 273 Paul Stewart  (1975–76)
GAA: 3.61 Rick Lemay  (1974–75)
SV%: 
Career Goals: 187 Rod Bloomfield 
Career Assists: 310 Rod Bloomfield 
Career Points: 497 Rod Bloomfield 
Career Penalty Minutes: 505 Paul Stewart 
Career Goaltending Wins: 
Career Shutouts: 
Career Games: 288 Rod Bloomfield

External links
 The Internet Hockey Database - Broome Dusters
 The Dusters WSKG history of the Broome Dusters
 - BinghamtonHockey.net - History of hockey in Binghamton 

Defunct ice hockey teams in the United States
Sports in Binghamton, New York
North American Hockey League (1973–1977) teams
Ice hockey teams in New York (state)
Ice hockey clubs established in 1973
Ice hockey clubs disestablished in 1977
1973 establishments in New York (state)
1977 disestablishments in New York (state)
Boston Bruins minor league affiliates